Mwalimu Nyerere University (MJNUAT), whose complete name is Mwalimu Julius Kambarage Nyerere University of Agriculture and Technology (MJNUAT), is a public university in Tanzania. MJNUAT focuses on the instruction of agricultural sciences, agricultural mechanization, and agribusiness.

Location
MNU maintains its main campus in the town of Butiama, Butiama District, Mara Region, in northern Tanzania, the birthplace of Julius Kambarage Nyerere (13 April 1922 – 14 October 1999), the founder president of modern-day Tanzania, who served as president of that country between 1964 until 1985.

The geographical coordinates of the main campus of Mwalimu Julius Kambarage Nyerere University of Agriculture and Technology are:
01°47'54.0"S, 33°58'25.0"E (Latitude:-1.798333; Longitude:33.973611).

University campuses
The campuses of MNU include the following:
  Main campus in Butiama.
  Other satellite campuses are planned at other locations in Mara Region of Tanzania.

History
In 2015, after the decision to establish MNU had been made, an agreement was signed between the Ministry of Education and Vocational Training and China Civil Engineering Construction Corporation for the construction of the main campus of the university. At that time, the actual cost was unknown, pending a feasibility study.

Construction of this institution received partial funding from the World Bank Group.

See also
Agriculture in Tanzania
Education in Tanzania
List of universities in Tanzania

References

External links
 Mwalimu Nyerere University Homepage

Universities and colleges in Tanzania
Agriculture in Tanzania
Mara Region
Public universities
Agricultural universities and colleges in Tanzania